"I Wanna Hold on to You" is a song by British singer-songwriter Mica Paris, released as the second single from her third studio album, Whisper a Prayer (1993). Co-written by Paris with Narada Michael Walden and Sally Jo Dakota, it peaked at number 27 on the UK Singles Chart and number five on Music Weeks Dance Singles chart.

Critical reception
In his weekly UK chart commentary, James Masterton described the song as a "fairly standard piece of Brit soul". Alan Jones from Music Week felt that after the massive "I Never Felt Like This Before", "Mica Paris tackles a less flowing, looser and altogether jazzier song. Vocally superb, but lacking the commercial appeal of the aforementioned single, "I Wanna Hold On to You" is likely to peter out a good 10 or so places lower." James Hamilton from the RM Dance Update described it as "EnVogue-ish" and "slinky". Damon Albarn and Alex James of Blur reviewed the song for Smash Hits, giving it five out of five. Albarn said that "she definitely sounds more and more like Anita Baker the more records she puts out." He added, "Mica is a really sexy woman, it's sexy music. It gives me the horn. It's energetic and sexy."

Music video
A music video was produced to promote the single, directed by American artist, photographer, director and creative director Matthew Rolston. It was later published on YouTube in March 2018.

Track listings

CD
Europe

12-inch
UK

US

7-inch
Netherlands

Personnel
Personnel are obtained from the Whisper a Prayer liner notes.

Performance credits
 Lead vocals – Mica Paris
 Background vocals – Mica Paris

Instruments
 Guitar – Vernon 'Ice' Black
 Keyboards – Mike Mani
 Bass synth – Narada Michael Walden

Technical and production
 Arrangement – Narada Michael Walden
 Songwriters – Narada Michael Walden, Sally Jo Dakota, Mica Paris
 Engineering – Marc 'Elvis' Reyburn
 Engineering assistants – Jeff 'G' Gray
 Mastering – Bernie Grundman
 Mixing – David 'Frazeman' Frazer
 Production – Narada Michael Walden, Mike Mani
 Programming – Mike Mani

Charts

References

1993 singles
1993 songs
4th & B'way Records singles
Mica Paris songs
Music videos directed by Matthew Rolston